Marsha Chantal de Cordova (born 23 January 1976) is a British Labour Party politician serving as the Member of Parliament (MP) for Battersea since 2017. She was Shadow Secretary of State for Women and Equalities from 6 April 2020 until her resignation on 14 September 2021.

Early life and education
De Cordova was born on 23 January 1976 in Bristol, England. She has five siblings, one of whom is professional footballer Bobby Decordova-Reid. She was born with nystagmus and is registered blind. De Cordova attended Hanham High School (now Hanham Woods Academy).

De Cordova studied Law and European Policy Studies at London South Bank University. After graduating she worked at a number of charities including Action for Blind People before founding the charity South East London Vision in 2014.

Prior to becoming an MP, she was the engagement and advocacy director at the charity, Thomas Pocklington Trust.

Political career
De Cordova was elected as a Labour Party councillor for the Larkhall ward on Lambeth Council in 2014.

She was elected as MP for Battersea in the 2017 general election. It was previously held by Conservative politician Jane Ellison since 2010.

De Cordova was appointed as the Shadow Minister for Disabled People on 9 October 2017, replacing Marie Rimmer. She was promoted to Shadow Secretary of State for Women and Equalities by new Labour leader, Keir Starmer, replacing Dawn Butler.

As an MP, she has been involved in campaigning to make the Parliamentary Estate more accessible for disabled people.

In May 2021, alongside celebrities and other public figures, de Cordova was a signatory to an open letter from the magazine Stylist, which called on the government to address what it described as an "epidemic of male violence" by funding an "ongoing, high-profile, expert-informed awareness campaign on men's violence against women and girls".

In August 2021, de Cordova was criticised for not attending an annual Stonewall event about the Labour Party and LGBT+ rights due to 'diary clashes'. She was the first shadow equalities secretary to not attend the event since it was created.

De Cordova resigned from her post as shadow equalities secretary in September 2021 in order to focus on her marginal constituency of Battersea.

References

External links

1976 births
Living people
UK MPs 2017–2019
Labour Party (UK) MPs for English constituencies
Female members of the Parliament of the United Kingdom for English constituencies
Councillors in the London Borough of Lambeth
Blind politicians
Black British women politicians
Labour Party (UK) councillors
21st-century British women politicians
UK MPs 2019–present
Black British MPs
Women councillors in England